Arthur's Pass, previously called Camping Flat then Bealey Flats, and for some time officially Arthurs Pass, is a township in the Southern Alps of the South Island of New Zealand, located in the Selwyn district. It is a popular base for exploring Arthur's Pass National Park.

The Bealey River runs through the township.

Naming and history
The township and the pass take their names after Arthur Dudley Dobson (1841–1934, Sir Arthur from 1931). The Chief Surveyor of Canterbury Province, Thomas Cass, had tasked Arthur Dobson to find out if there was an available pass out of the Waimakariri watershed into valleys running to the West Coast. In 1864 Arthur's brother Edward Henry Dobson joined him and accompanied him over the watershed into the valley of the Otira River. A West Coast Māori chief, Tarapuhi, told Arthur of a pass that Māori hunting-parties occasionally used. When Arthur returned to Christchurch, he sketched the country he had traversed and included it in a report to Cass. Arthur Dobson did not name the pass, which he found very steep on the western side. Dobson gave the name "Camping Flat" to the site that became the township.

When the West Coast Gold Rush began in 1864, a committee of businessmen offered a £200 prize for anyone who would find a better or more suitable pass from Canterbury over the Southern Alps to West Canterbury (the West Coast). At the same time George Dobson, (another brother), was sent to examine every available pass between the watershed of the Taramakau, Waimakariri, and the Hurunui. After examining passes at the head of every valley he reported that "Arthur's" pass was by far the most suitable for the direct crossing.

The township, at the time named Bealey Flats after the second Superintendent of Canterbury, Samuel Bealey, was originally built as a construction village for the building of the Otira Tunnel, which started on 14 January 1908. The railway from Christchurch reached Arthur's Pass township in 1914, the Westland section having advanced to Otira. Construction of the tunnel was very slow; it finally finished in 1923, and its opening marked by the British and Intercolonial Exhibition. The TranzAlpine passenger rail service passes through Arthur's Pass and the Otira Tunnel as part of its  journey from Christchurch to Greymouth. The trip is considered one of the world's great train journeys due to its scenery and views.

A power station was built below the Devil's Punchbowl Falls to provide electricity for the tunnel construction and for the village itself.

In 1929, the Arthur's Pass National Park was established, New Zealand's third national park. An earthquake measuring 7.1 struck Arthurs Pass on 9 March 1929. Slips closed the road to the west coast for months and there was damage to the railway lines. The earthquake was thought to have occurred due to movement along the Poulter Fault.

The Geographic Board had a policy of omitting apostrophes in place names, and the name was officially changed to "Arthurs Pass". This caused an upset with the local population, and the Minister of Lands reinstated the old version with the apostrophe. On 16 September 1975 the New Zealand Post Office also adopted the spelling with the apostrophe.

Demographics
It is part of the statistical area of Craigieburn. 

Arthur's Pass had a population of 48 at the 2018 New Zealand census, a decrease of 6 people (-11.1%) since the 2013 census, and a decrease of 27 people (-36.0%) since the 2006 census. There were 30 households. There were 27 males and 21 females, giving a sex ratio of 1.29 males per female. The median age was 44.0 years (compared with 37.4 years nationally), with 3 people (6.2%) aged under 15 years, 9 (18.8%) aged 15 to 29, 30 (62.5%) aged 30 to 64, and 3 (6.2%) aged 65 or older.

Ethnicities were 81.2% European/Pākehā, 0.0% Māori, 6.2% Pacific peoples, and 18.8% Asian (totals add to more than 100% since people could identify with multiple ethnicities).

Although some people objected to giving their religion, 56.2% had no religion, 31.2% were Christian and 6.2% had other religions.

Of those at least 15 years old, 24 (53.3%) people had a bachelor or higher degree, and 3 (6.7%) people had no formal qualifications. The median income was $36,600, compared with $31,800 nationally. The employment status of those at least 15 was that 30 (66.7%) people were employed full-time, 9 (20.0%) were part-time, and 3 (6.7%) were unemployed.

Climate
Arthur's Pass Village lies in a valley about 750 metres above sea level and is about 4 km south of Arthur's Pass (920 m). Arthur's Pass Village falls under the Köppen-Geiger climate classification of Cfb (Oceanic). On average, January is the warmest month with an average of 13.2°C, and July is the coldest with an average of 2.1°C. Snowfall is not uncommon during winter, especially in the mountains above the village.

Facilities and attractions

New Zealand's first national park visitor centre was built in Arthur's Pass in 1959, with the help of the Christchurch Wanderers Tramping Club. It was designed by Christchurch architect Paul Pascoe and used local stone to reflect the geology of the national park. As well as Department of Conservation offices, the building housed museum displays on the history of Arthur's Pass (including Richard Seddon's stagecoach) and archives detailing the history of the National Park. In 2019 the building was declared earthquake prone, and the visitor centre was moved to a portacabin across the road. The cost to upgrade the building to the required standard was estimated at NZ$3 million.

Visitor accommodation is provided, from camp ground up to hotel standard. The township provides a general store, a petrol station, tea rooms and restaurants. Arthurs Pass is well known as a starting point for many excellent tramping tracks within the Arthurs Pass National Park.

There are also several good walks from here, including the Devil's Punchbowl Falls, Bealey Valley and Avalanche Peak. The mischievous kea (New Zealand mountain parrot) can be found here.

The club skifield Temple Basin is nearby and is a popular attraction through winter.

The town can be reached by The Tranz Alpine Express train on the famous Midland Line. State Highway 73 also passes through the town.

References

External links

 Spectacular footage Train plowing through deep snow Arthur's Pass
 Arthur's Pass Website

Selwyn District
Populated places in Canterbury, New Zealand
Rail mountain passes of New Zealand
Arthur's Pass National Park